Cephaeline is an alkaloid that is found in Cephaelis ipecacuanha and other plant species including Psychotria acuminata.  Cephaeline induces vomiting by stimulating the stomach lining and is found in commercial products such as syrup of ipecac.  Chemically, it is closely related to emetine.

Poison treatment
Cephaeline in the form of syrup of ipecac was once commonly recommended as an emergency treatment for accidental poisoning, but its use has been phased out due to its ineffectiveness.

References 

Isoquinoline alkaloids
Phenols
Norsalsolinol ethers
Emetics
Drugs with no legal status